Edvard Hans Hoff (11 April 1838 – 7 June 1933) was a Norwegian politician for the Conservative Party. He was Minister of Defence from 1889 to 1891. Hoff was military officer, and was promoted to Lieutenant General (generalløytnant) in 1905. He wrote the first bridge manual in Norway in 1907, titled Bridge - Spillets love, regler og etikette ("Bridge - the Laws, Rules and Etiquette of the game").

References

1838 births
1933 deaths
Defence ministers of Norway